John Bradley Sherman is an American intelligence official who has served as the Chief Information Officer at the Department of Defense since December 17, 2021. Prior to that, he served from June 2020 to January 2021 as the Principal Deputy DOD Chief Information Officer. Between 2017 and 2020 he served as Associate Director and Chief Information Officer of the Intelligence Community (IC) at the Office of the Director of National Intelligence.

Education 
Sherman graduated from Texas A&M University with a BA in history. He also earned a master's degree in public administration from the University of Houston. Following graduation from Texas A&M, he was a US Army Air Defense officer in the 24th Infantry Division. He is a graduate of the Department of Defense CAPSTONE course, ODNI's "Leading the IC" course, and the CIA Director's Seminar.

Career
Sherman was formerly the deputy director of CIA's Open Source Enterprise (OSE).  Before that, he served in several senior executive positions at NGA, dealing with analysis, collection, homeland security, organizational strategy, and international affairs.

Previously, Sherman was the principal deputy national intelligence officer for military issues on the National Intelligence Council, and as a White House Situation Room duty officer. He began his IC career in 1997 as a CIA imagery analyst assigned to the former National Imagery and Mapping Agency, now known as NGA.

Biden administration
On September 16, 2021, President Joe Biden nominated Sherman to be the Chief Information Officer in the Department of Defense. The Senate Armed Services Committee held hearings on his nomination on October 28, 2021. On December 8, 2021, the committee favorably reported Sherman's nomination to the Senate floor. The entire Senate confirmed his nomination via voice vote on December 14, 2021.

Awards and personal life
Sherman has been awarded the Meritorious Presidential Rank, the Intelligence Medal of Merit, NGA's Meritorious Civilian Service Medal, and Canada's Chief of Defense Intelligence Medallion. He is married with two grown children.

References

Trump administration personnel
Biden administration personnel
Living people
Year of birth missing (living people)